Proceso  may refer to:
 Proceso (magazine), a Mexican political magazine
 National Reorganization Process (Proceso de Reorganización Nacional), the dictatorship that ruled Argentina between 1976 and 1983